Burnham Overy is a civil parish on the north coast of Norfolk, England.

The civil parish has an area of 8.92 km2 and in the 2001 census had a population of 311 in 167 households, reducing to a population of 134 measured at the 2011 Census. For the purposes of local government, the parish falls within the district of King's Lynn and West Norfolk.

Etymology
The villages name means 'Homestead/village on the River Burn' or perhaps, 'hemmed-in land on the River Burn'. 'Overy', meaning 'Over the river', was added to distinguish it from the other Burnhams in Norfolk.

Location
The larger town of King’s Lynn is 20 miles (32 km) to the south-west (with the closest railway station), whilst the city of Norwich is 30 miles (48 km) to the south-east.

History
According to various letters and documents, Nelson learned to row and sail a dinghy at Burnham Overy Staithe, at the age of 10, two years before joining the Navy. The village’s only pub is called “The Hero” in his honour.

Historically Burnham Overy was the port for the surrounding villages of the Burnhams. Both settlements lie on the River Burn, and until the end of the Middle Ages trading ships were able to reach the village (now Burnham Overy Town). With the silting of the river, commercial traffic switched to the downstream Staithe. With the coming of the railway to the Burnhams in 1866, commercial shipping declined and the last cargo is believed to have been shipped from the Staithe soon after the end of the First World War.

Between Burnham Overy Staithe and the sea, the river spreads out into multiple tidal creeks through the salt marshes that fringe this stretch of coast, and finally reaches the sea by passing through the fronting sand dunes at a gap near Gun Hill locally known as Burnham Harbour. Small boats can reach Burnham Overy Staithe through this gap and creek. Today Burnham Overy Staithe, and the associated harbour, is a recreational sailing centre. It is also the point of departure for seasonal ferries to the Scolt Head Island National Nature Reserve.

To the east of the Burnham Overy creek, the former salt marshes between dry land and the sand dunes have been reclaimed to form fresh water meadows, part of the Holkham estate.

Notable residents
Robert Austin, artist and engraver
Richard Woodget, Captain of the Cutty Sark

In popular culture 
In Joan G. Robinson's 1967 book When Marnie Was There, the villages of Little Overton and Barnham are based upon Burnham Overy, especially the key locations of the staithe and the windmill.

Leith House Orchards, a family-run plum, greengage and damson orchard, which has fresh fruit and artisan products available during the season, was featured, in January 2023, in BBC Two's The Hairy Bikers Go Local.

References

External links

Photographs of Burnham Overy Staithe
Tide tables for Burnham Overy Staithe
Information from NorfolkCoast.co.uk on Burnham Overy.
Webcam showing the harbour at Burnham Overy Staithe

Villages in Norfolk
King's Lynn and West Norfolk
Populated coastal places in Norfolk
Civil parishes in Norfolk